Molecular Vision is a peer-reviewed open access medical journal that covers the molecular and cellular biology and genetics of the cortical and ocular visual systems.

External links 
 

Ophthalmology journals
Publications established in 1995
Emory University
Monthly journals
English-language journals
Open access journals